The Lainici Monastery is a Romanian Orthodox monastery located  from Târgu Jiu.

History
First mention of this monastery was in 14th century. The monastery was constructed during the reign of John Caradja Voivode between 1812 and 1817.

Gallery

References
 România - Harta mănăstirilor, Amco Press, 2000
 http://www.manastirealainici.ro/
 Harta Lainici

External links

Lainici Monastery at Romanian-monasteries.go.ro

Romanian Orthodox monasteries of Gorj County
Historic monuments in Gorj County